Emílio is a variant of the given names Emil, Emilio and Emilios, and may refer to:

Emílio Garrastazu Médici, Brazilian politician
Emílio Peixe, Brazilian footballer
Emílio Lino, Portuguese fencer
Emílio da Silva, footballer
Emílio Augusto Goeldi, Swiss-Brazilian naturalist and zoologist, also known as Émil Goeldi
Emílio Henrique Baumgart, Brazilian engineer
Emílio Costa, Angolan singer known as Don Kikas